Bothrotes is a genus of darkling beetles in the family Tenebrionidae. There are at least 2 described species in Bothrotes.

Species
 Bothrotes canaliculatus (Say)
 Bothrotes plumbeus

References

Further reading

 Arnett, R.H. Jr., M. C. Thomas, P. E. Skelley and J. H. Frank. (eds.). (2002). American Beetles, Volume II: Polyphaga: Scarabaeoidea through Curculionoidea. CRC Press LLC, Boca Raton, FL.
 
 Richard E. White. (1983). Peterson Field Guides: Beetles. Houghton Mifflin Company.

Pimeliinae